The kidnapping and murder of Aldo Moro, also referred to in Italy as Moro Case, was a seminal event in Italian political history.

On the morning of 16 March 1978, the day on which the new cabinet led by Giulio Andreotti was supposed to have undergone a confidence vote in the Italian Parliament, the car of Aldo Moro, former prime minister and then president of Christian Democracy (Italian: Democrazia Cristiana, or DC, Italy's relative majority party at the time), was assaulted by a group of far-left terrorists known as the Red Brigades (Italian: Brigate Rosse, or BR) in Via Fani in Rome. Firing automatic weapons, the terrorists killed Moro's bodyguards (two Carabinieri in Moro's car and three policemen in the following car) and kidnapped him.

On 9 May 1978, Moro's body was found in the trunk of a Renault 4 in Via Caetani after 54 days of imprisonment, during which Moro was submitted to a political trial by the so-called "people's court" set up by the Brigate Rosse and the Italian government was asked for an exchange of prisoners. Despite the common interpretation, the car location in Via Caetani was not halfway between, but was very close to both, the locations of the national offices of DC and of the Italian Communist Party (PCI) in Rome.

Kidnapping

The assault 

The terrorists had prepared the ambush by parking two cars in Via Mario Fani which, once moved, would prevent Moro's cars from escaping. According to the official reconstruction at the subsequent trials, eleven people participated in the assault. However, several doubts have been cast on the terrorists' declarations on which the official accounts were based, and about the exact identity of the ambush team's members. The presence of Moro himself in Via Fani during the ambush has also been questioned after revelations in the 1990s (see Theory of the alternative kidnapping).

At 08:45, the Red Brigades members took their positions at the end of Via Fani, a downhill street in the northern quarter of Rome. Four of them (Morucci, Gallinari, Fiore and Bonisoli) were wearing Alitalia airline crew uniforms. Since not all team members knew each other, the uniforms were needed to avoid friendly fire. In the upper part of the road, and on the right-hand side, Mario Moretti was inside a Fiat 128 with a fake diplomatic license plate. Alvaro Lojacono and Alessio Casimirri were in another Fiat 128 some meters ahead of him. On the opposite side there was a third Fiat 128, with Barbara Balzerani inside, facing the supposed direction from which Moro would arrive.  occupied a fourth car, a Fiat 132, near the crossroads where the street ended.

Moro left his house a few minutes before 09:00. He was sitting in a blue Fiat 130 driven by Domenico Ricci. Another carabiniere, marshal Oreste Leonardi, sat beside him. Leonardi was the head of the bodyguard team. The Fiat 130 was followed by a white Alfetta with the remaining bodyguards: Francesco Zizzi, Giulio Rivera and Raffaele Iozzino.

The ambush began when the two cars entered Via Fani and the terrorists were alerted by a lookout located at the corner with via Trionfale, who waved a bunch of flowers and then went away on a moped. Moretti's Fiat 128 cut the road in front of Moro's car, which bumped into the rear of Moretti's car and remained blocked between it and the bodyguards' Alfetta. Ricci tried an escape manoeuver, but was thwarted by a Mini Minor casually parked at the crossroad. Moro's cars were finally trapped from behind by Lojacono's 128. At this point four armed terrorists jumped out from the bushes at the sides of the street, firing machine pistols. The action has shown an analogy to a similar one by the German far-left formation RAF. One unidentified witness declared that a German voice was heard during the ambush, which led to a presumption of the presence of RAF militiamen in the ambush.

91 bullets were fired of which 45 hit the bodyguards, who were all killed. 49 shots came from a single weapon, a FNAB-43 submachine gun, and 22 from another of the same model. The remaining 20 shots came from other weapons which included a Beretta M12. Ricci and Leonardi, who were sitting in the front seat of the first car, were killed first. Moro was immediately kidnapped and forced into the Fiat 132 which was next to his car. At the same time the terrorists shot the other three policemen. The only policeman who was able to shoot back twice was Iozzino, but he was immediately hit in the head by Bonisoli. All the guards died in the action but Francesco Zizzi, who died in the hospital a few hours later. The blue Fiat 132 was found at 09:40 in Via Licinio Calvo with some blood stains inside. The other cars used for the ambush were also found in the following days in the same road (according to the declarations of Red Brigade members, the cars had been left in the road that same day).

On 16 March, the escort in Via Fani was not carrying weapons, which were instead kept in the trunks of the cars; Eleonora Chiavarelli (Aldo Moro's wife) said, during the trial, that the weapons were in the trunks because "these people didn't know how to use weapons because they had never had any shooting practice, they were not used to handling them, so the guns were in the trunk. Leonardi always talked about it. "These people shouldn't have weapons they don't know how to use. They should know how to use them. They should carry them properly. Keep them within reach. The radio should be operational, but it doesn't work." For months it had been going on like this. Marshal Leonardi and lance corporal Ricci did not expect an ambush, because their weapons were placed in the bag and one of the two holsters was even in a plastic liner." The last sentence was denied by the widow of Marshal Leonardi, stating that her husband "recently went around armed because he had noticed that a car was following him."

The action was claimed by the BR in a phone call to ANSA. At 10:00 Pietro Ingrao, president of the Italian Chamber of Deputies, stopped the session and announced that Moro had been kidnapped. On the same day Andreotti's government obtained a large majority of votes, including those of his traditional enemies, notably PCI. Before the kidnapping the Communists were supposed to enter the government in a direct role but the emergency changed the situation, resulting in another right-centre cabinet under the firm control of DC. Enrico Berlinguer spoke of "an attempt to stop a positive political process", but Lucio Magri, representative of the extreme left PUP, was concerned about the hypocrisy of passing laws limiting personal freedom as a reaction to the massacre, saying that "it would play into the hands of the strategy of subversion". He asked for "self-criticism" from the authorities and for a genuine willingness to tackle problems "that are at the basis of the economic and moral crisis".

Mario Ferrandi, a militant of Prima Linea, nicknamed "Coniglio" (Rabbit), later said that when the news of the kidnapping and the killing of the bodyguards spread during a workers' demonstration there was a moment of amazement, followed by a moment of euphoria and anxiety because there was a feeling that something would happen so big that things would not be quite the same. He recalled that students present at the event spent the money of Cassa del circolo giovanile to buy champagne and toast with workers of the canteen.

Motivations 

A large amount of literature exists about the reasons for the kidnapping. The Red Brigades chose Moro due to his role as mediator between DC and PCI, the two main parties in Italy at the time, which had both participated in the Fourth Andreotti Cabinet. It was the first time since 1947 that Italian Communists had a government position, even if indirect. The success of the action would thus halt the Communists' rise to Italian state institutions, reassuring the BR as a key point in a future revolutionary war against capitalism. According to others BR aimed to strike at the whole DC who were the main exponent of a regime that, as described in BR's first communiqué after the kidnapping "... had been suppressing the Italian people for years".

According to later terrorist declarations, in the months before the kidnapping the Red Brigades had also envisaged the kidnapping of the other DC leader, Giulio Andreotti. This was abandoned once they deemed that Andreotti's police protection was too strong.

The immediate consequence of the kidnapping was the exclusion of PCI from any government cabinet in the following years. Although increasingly weakened, DC remained the main government party until 1994 (although in 1981, a non-Christian Democrat, Giovanni Spadolini, became premier in a DC-based alliance— for the first time since the formation of the Italian Republic).

Imprisonment
The exact location of Moro's imprisonment is disputed.

The original reconstruction in the trials claimed it to be an apartment in Via Camillo Montalcini 8 in Rome, which had been owned by a Red Brigades member for a few years. Moro would be killed there, in an underground parking garage. Months after the kidnapping the apartment was put under investigation by UCIGOS, the Italian police's central directorate for political crimes, and was thus abandoned by the Red Brigades.

Aldo Moro's brother Carlo Alfredo, a judge, writes in his book Storia di un delitto annunciato that the politician was not detained in Via Montalcini, but in a seaside location. His theory is based on the fact that sand and vegetable remains were found in the car together with Moro's body. Further, Moro's body had a generally good muscular tone and according to Moro's brother this, along with several contradictions in the terrorists' declarations, contravenes the traditional view of the politician closed in a very tight cell with little space to move. More proof was found by geologist David Bressan, who showed that based on certain microfossils and grains of igneous rock found on the victim and car he must have been located on an artificial (as opposed to natural) river beach near the delta of the river Tiber. While the kidnappers later claimed to have tried to mislead the investigators by pouring water and sand onto the victim and into the car, forensic geologists doubt that the killers at the time would have been aware of grains of sand as possible evidence for a crime and would not likely have gone through such effort.

Aldo Moro's letters 

During his detention, Moro wrote 86 letters to the main members of Christian Democracy, his family and to Pope Paul VI. Some arrived at their addressees; others that had not been sent were later found in another base of the BR in via Monte Nevoso, Milan. In the letters Moro puts forward the possibility of negotiation for his liberation if help from his party's colleagues and of the highest figures of the Republic could be obtained.

Some of Moro's letters allegedly contain hidden allusions and hints. In one letter he asks: "Is maybe there, behind keeping it hard against me, an American or German instruction?" Writer Leonardo Sciascia suggested that in his letters Moro was including clues about his position, as when he wrote "I am here in full health" to indicate that he was in Rome. In the letter of 8 April, Moro launched a vibrant attack at Benigno Zaccagnini, national secretary of Christian Democracy, at Francesco Cossiga, then Minister of the Interior, as well as on the whole of his party: "Of course, I cannot prevent myself from underlining the wickedness of all the Christian Democrats who did not agree with my position [...] And Zaccagnini? How can he stay tranquil in his position? And Cossiga could not devise any possible defence? My blood will fall over them."

Doubts have been cast over the complete publication of Moro's letters. The Carabinieri general Carlo Alberto Dalla Chiesa (then coordinator of the fight against terrorism in Italy, later killed by the Mafia) found copies of some previously unknown letters in an apartment used by the terrorists in via Monte Nevoso. For undisclosed reasons the finding was not publicly revealed for years. During the kidnapping the prevalent view was that Moro did not enjoy complete freedom to write. Despite Moro's wife declaring that she recognized his writing style in them, the letters would be considered, if not directly dictated by the terrorists, at least to be inspired or controlled by them. Some experts in an analysis committee formed by Cossiga initially declared that Moro had been subject to brainwashing. Cossiga would later admit that he had partially written the speech held by Giulio Andreotti in which it was said that Moro's letter were to be considered "not morally authentic".

Aldo Moro was never tortured by the Red Brigades during the 55 days; in the 1990s, Italian journalist Indro Montanelli commented severely on the letters written during the kidnapping, saying that "Everyone in this world has the right to be afraid. But a Statesman (and Moro was the State) can't try to induce the State to a negotiation with terrorists that over all, in the kidnapping of Via Fani, had left on the asphalt five dead between Carabinieri and policemen."

Montanelli was also scathingly critical of Moro's widow, Eleonora Chiavarelli, who, in the years after her husband was killed, blamed the Christian Democrats and the Italian political class in general for his fate. In 1982, he wrote:

Communications and negotiations 
During the 55 days of Moro's detention, the Red Brigades issued nine "Communications" in which they explained the reasons for the kidnapping. In the Communication No.3:

And:

The Red Brigades proposed to exchange Moro for imprisoned terrorists (Communication No.8). They later accepted to exchange him for a single terrorist. On 22 April 1978, Pope Paul VI made a public speech and asked BR to return Moro to his family, specifying that such act should also be "without conditions". Moro, who had previously written a letter to the Pope, reacted angrily to the latter point, feeling he had been abandoned by the Vatican. The specified "without conditions" is controversial—according to some sources it was added to Paul VI's letter against his will, and the pope instead wanted to negotiate with the kidnappers. Government members like Cossiga denied this hypothesis.

Italian politicians were divided into two factions: one favourable to negotiations which, amongst others, included the secretary of the Italian Socialist Party, Bettino Craxi and the others totally negating that possibility, most of the Christian Democracy and Italian Communist Party, including the latter's national secretary Enrico Berlinguer and Republican leader Ugo La Malfa who proposed the death penalty for the terrorists. The second faction alleged that any negotiation would seem a legitimisation of the violence of the terrorists. Further, that solution would not be accepted by the Italian police forces who had seen numerous members fall during the war against terrorism in previous years.

Writers, including Moro's brother, underlined how the BR's communication lacked any reference to the possible role of the Communist Party in the Italian government. This was in spite of the day chosen for the kidnapping being that in which PCI, for the first time since the early republican years, was going to obtain an active government role in Italy. A letter by Moro to Zaccagnini, in which he was referring to this argument, had to be rewritten by the politician.

A second point put forward was the premise that Moro's revelations, from most of the communication during his "political process", would be made public. Unlike other people kidnapped by the BR and subjected to same procedure and, in spite of the unprecedented repetition of the point, in the case of Moro this never happened. Much of the material collected by the terrorists, including Moro's letter and personal notes written during his imprisonment, became public only after the discovery of the base in via Monte Nevoso. The terrorists later declared they had destroyed all the material  containing references to Operation Gladio discovered in 1990.

Journalist Indro Montanelli sided in favor of firmness and against the negotiations from the first day and in 2000, responding to a reader on Corriere della Sera, wrote:

Discovery of the body 

Communication No.9 stated that:

The depositions made to the Italian judges during the trials showed that not all the Red Brigades leaders were for condemning Moro to death. Mario Moretti called Moro's wife by phone, asking her to push the DC leaders for negotiations. Adriana Faranda, a member of BR, mentioned a night meeting held in Milan a few days before the murder of Moro where she and other terrorists, including Valerio Morucci and Franco Bonisoli, dissented although the final decision was taken after voting.

On 9 May 1978, after a summary "people's trial", Moro was murdered by Mario Moretti. It was also determined that  participated. The body was found that same day in the trunk of a red Renault 4 in via Michelangelo Caetani in the historic centre of Rome. The location was mentioned by journalist Carmine Pecorelli as the residence of opera conductor Igor Markevitch who, according to some theories, was the alleged instigator of the whole kidnapping.

According to the terrorist's declarations, made some ten years after the event, Moro was woken up at 06:00 with the excuse that he had to be moved to another secret base. In contradiction to this Bonisoli said that Moro was told that he had been "pardoned" and was going to be freed. The terrorists put him into a wicker basket and brought him to the parking garage of their base in via Montalcini. They put him into the trunk of a red Renault and, after covering him with a red sheet, Moretti shot Moro with a 9 mm Walther PPK and after the weapon jammed, a 7.65 mm Škorpion vz. 61. The bullets perforated Moro's lungs and killed him.

The car with his body was taken to via Caetani where it was parked about one hour after the murder. The common interpretation was that the location was midway between the national seats of DC and of the Italian Communist Party (PCI) in Rome to symbolize the end of the Historic Compromise, the alliance between DC and PCI which Moro had sought. In fact, the car was found more towards the Tiber River, near the Ghetto. At 12:30, a phone call was made to Francesco Tritto, assistant of Aldo Moro in order to let him announce the location of the body. This fulfilled an exliciti will communicated by Aldo Moro to his kidnappers. At 13:30, a phone call, attributed to Valerio Morucci, notified the Prefecture of Police that the politician's body was in a car in via Caetani. Autoptic examinations made after the discovery assigned the death to around 09:00 and 10:00 of the same day, in contradiction to the terrorist's declarations. Witnesses declared that the car was in the street as early as 08:00 AM, while some witnesses declared that they did not see it before 12:30 AM.

Moro was wearing the same grey clothes he had during the kidnapping. The cravat had several blood stains, traces of sand were found in the pockets and socks, and traces of vegetables were also found. Eventually the terrorists declared that they had intentionally added those traces in order to sidetrack the investigators. In the trunk, there were also some of Moro's personal effects, a bracelet and his watch, and some spent cartridges. Moro also had a thigh wound, likely suffered during the initial assault in via Fani.

Subsequent hypotheses, investigations and trials 
Despite the long investigations and trials, the exact details of the kidnapping and murder of Aldo Moro are not known.

Crisis committees 
Francesco Cossiga, minister of the interior at the time, formed two "crisis committees" on the very day of the kidnapping of Moro. These were:
 a technical-operational-political committee, chaired by Cossiga himself and, in his absence, by undersecretary Nicola Lettieri. Other members included the supreme commanders of the Italian Police Forces, of the Carabinieri, the Guardia di Finanza, the recently named directors of SISMI and SISDE  (respectively, Italy's military and civil intelligence services), the national secretary of CESIS (a secret information agency), the director of UCIGOS and the police prefect of Rome.
 an information committee, including members of CESIS, SISDE, SISMI and SIOS, another military intelligence office.

A third unofficial committee was created which never met officially, called the comitato di esperti ("committee of experts"). Its existence was not disclosed until 1981, by Cossiga himself, in his interrogation by the Italian Parliament's Commission about the Moro affair. He omitted to reveal the decisions and the activities of the committee however. This committee included: Steve Pieczenik, a psychologist of the anti-terrorism section of the US State Department, a criminologist Franco Ferracuti, Stefano Silvestri,  (director of the Istituto per l'Enciclopedia Italiana) and Giulia Conte Micheli.

Despite these changes, in the months that the kidnapping of Aldo Moro developed and executed, no Secret Service was designed to combat internal subversion. The committees were acting according to old standards: the planning of measures to be taken in case of emergency dating back to the 1950s, and it hadn't been updated even after the alarming growth of terrorism. This was due to the fact that the country had spread an atmosphere of resignation (if not indulgence) to the left-wing terrorism, because in the trials defendants get extenuating circumstances, Prima Linea was considered a simple subversive association (instead of an armed gang) and a part of the judiciary harbored hostility towards the State and was sympathetic to the revolutionary myths; so that the political scientist  said that terrorism had become "a historical phenomenon understandable (though not justifiable) in a period of social change thwarted by a corrupt political class".

Terrorists involved in the kidnapping

Involvement of P2, Gladio and of the Italian intelligence services
Several authorities have suggested that Propaganda 2 (P2) was involved in the kidnapping of Aldo Moro. Propaganda 2 was a secret masonic lodge involved in numerous financial and political scandals in Italy in the 1970s and 1980s and which featured as its members entrepreneurs, journalists, numerous high exponents of right-wing parties, the Italian police and military forces. Another theory supposes that the Red Brigades had been infiltrated by the American Central Intelligence Agency (CIA) or by the Organizzazione Gladio, a paramilitary clandestine network headed by NATO whose main task was to oppose Soviet influence in western Europe.

During the days of Moro's imprisonment, journalist Carmine Pecorelli (see also below) wrote, in his magazine Osservatorio politico, an article entitled "Vergogna, buffoni!" ("Shame on you, clowns!"): in it he wrote that Giulio Andreotti had met general Dalla Chiesa who told the politician that he knew the location where Moro was kept, but did not obtain the authorization to proceed to free him due to (in Pecorelli's words) a certain "Christ's lodge in paradise". The likely allusion to P2 became clear only after the discovery of a list of the lodge members on 17 March 1981. Members of the lodge occupied important institutional positions and included: Giuseppe Santovito, director of SISMI; prefect Walter Pelosi, director of CESIS; general Giulio Grassini of SISDE; admiral Antonino Geraci, commander of SIOS; Federico Umberto D'Amato, director of the Office of Reserved Affairs of the Ministry of the Interiors; generals Raffaele Giudice and Donato Lo Prete, respectively commander and chief-of-staff of the Guardia di Finanza; and Carabinieri general Giuseppe Siracusano, responsible for road blocks in the capital during the investigations of the Moro affair.

Licio Gelli declared that the presence of numerous members of P2 in the committees was casual, since numerous personalities were members at the time, and this was simply a statistic reflected by the composition of the committees. According to Gelli, some members of the committees did not know that some of their colleagues were also part of P2.

On 16 March 1978, the day of Moro's kidnapping, the most important members of P2 met in the Hotel Excelsior in Rome—a few hundred meters from the United States Embassy. While exiting the hotel Gelli declared "the most difficult part is done". It was supposed that his words referred to the abduction of Moro.

Another debated case was regarding the presence of Camillo Guglielmi, a colonel of SISMI's 7th Division which controlled Operation Gladio, in via Stresa near the location of the ambush, and in those exact minutes when the BR kidnapped Moro. His presence was kept secret and was only disclosed in 1990 during the investigation of the Italian Parliament commission on State Massacres. Guglielmi admitted that he was in via Stresa, but only because he had been invited to lunch by a colleague. According to several sources the colleague confirmed that Guglielmi came to his house, but had not been invited. Furthermore, Italians normally have lunch at around 12:30 and Guglielmi's presence at around 09:00 would not be justified. Other sources list Guglielmi as a true member of Gladio, but the officer always firmly denied this accusation. His direct superior, general Pietro Musumeci, was a member of P2 and condemned for sidetracking the investigations on the 1980 Bologna Station bombing.

The discovery of the BR refuge in via Gradoli (see also below) saw the participation of members of both P2 and the police forces of Italy. Lucia Mokbel, an informer of SISDE, had communicated that she had heard Morse messages coming from the flat next to her. It turned out that those noises interpreted as Morse code were in fact coming from the electric typewriter used by the Terrorists (BR) to type their demand letters. She informed police commissar Elio Coppa, enlisted in the Propaganda Due, but when police agents went to the flat and knocked on the door, strangely they did not attempt to enter it and left the place instead. SISDE had been also informed that a lock-up garage in via Gradoli had an antenna, allegedly used by the terrorist to communicate with the area of Lake Duchessa. However Giulio Grassini, head of SISDE and member of P2, did not take any investigative measures.

Investigations made by DIGOS discovered that several machines used by the terrorists to print their communications from one year before the kidnapping of Moro, which was financed by Moretti, had been previously owned by the Italian state. These included a printer owned by the Raggruppamento Unità Speciali dell'Esercito and, despite its relatively young age and its high value, had been sold out as scrap. A photocopier was previously owned by the Ministry of Transportation, acquired in 1969 and later sold to Enrico Triaca, a member of BR.

The apartment in via Gradoli (see below) had been rented by Mario Moretti under the pseudonym of Mario Borghi since 1978. The same building housed several apartments owned by SISDE men and one inhabited by a police confidant. During the days of the kidnapping the palace was inspected by Carabinieri under colonel Varisco, with the exclusion of Moretti's apartment—the official justification was that the Carabinieri were not authorized to enter the apartments if no one was inside. The owner of the apartment, Luciana Bozzi, was later discovered to be a friend of Giuliana Conforto, whose father was named in the Mitrokhin list of the KGB. Morucci and Faranda were eventually arrested in her flat. Pecorelli wrote a postcard to Moretti in 1977 from Ascoli Piceno (Moretti was born in the province of Ascoli), addressing it to one "Borghi at via Gradoli", with the message "Greetings, brrrr".

In June 2008, the Venezuelan terrorist Ilich Ramírez Sánchez, best known as "Carlos the Jackal", spoke in an interview released to the Italian press agency ANSA declaring that several men of the SISMI, led by colonel Stefano Giovannone (considered near to Moro) negotiated at the airport in Beirut for the liberation of the politician during the night of 8 to 9 May 1978: the agreement would endorse the liberation of several imprisoned members of the BR to the Popular Front for the Liberation of Palestine in the territory of an Arabic country. According to Carlos, the agreement, which found the opposition of the SISMI leading figures, failed because news about it leaked to other western secret services who, in turn, informed SISMI. Moro was killed the following day. Carlos stated that the officers involved in the attempt were all expelled from the services, being forced to resign or to go into compulsory retirement on a pension.

Involvement of foreign powers 

In 2005, Giovanni Galloni, former national vice-secretary of Christian Democracy, said that during a discussion with Moro about the difficulty to find the Red Brigades' bases Moro told him that he knew of the presence of US and Israeli intelligence agents infiltrated within the BR. However the information obtained was not given to the Italian investigators. He also declared that the reason of the assassination of journalist Carmine Pecorelli was the same information, perhaps coming from the United States.

During an interview in front of the Italian parliament commission on terrorism Galloni also stated that, during his trip to the United States in 1976, he had been told that a government like that envisaged by Moro, which would include the Communist presence, would be opposed at "any cost" by the American Republicans.

During the 1983 trial against the BR, Moro's widow Eleonora Chiavarelli declared that her husband was unpopular in the United States due to the historic compromise matter, and that he had been repeatedly warned by American politicians to stop disrupting the political situation which had been established in the Yalta conference (in reference to the possible executive role of the Italian Communist Party). According to her, Henry Kissinger was one of the American personalities who menaced Moro in 1974 and 1976. She said that the words to Moro which he repeated to her were:

Kissinger denied these accusations.

Alberto Franceschini, one of the founders of BR, mentioned the possibility that the Red Brigades had been infiltrated by Israeli agents as early as 1974. He reported a confidence told to him by co-founder Renato Curcio, according to whom Mario Moretti would be an infiltrated agent. Curcio has always denied this reconstruction. Moretti took the reins of the Red Brigades after Franceschini and Curcio were arrested in the mid-1970s, introducing a far stronger militarization of the organization's activities.

Moretti, in the Italian RAI TV programme La notte della Repubblica denied these accusations, saying that he had never seen an Israeli in his life and that it was wrong to think that the change of RB's strategy depended from the arrest of some militants. He also added:

The false Communication No. 7 and the discovery of the base of via Gradoli 
Another controversial event occurred on 18 April 1978 when a false BR's "Communication No. 7" announced the death of Moro and that he had been on the bottom of Lago della Duchessa, a very small mountain lake in the province of Rieti (north of Rome). In response, the Italian police looked in vain for Moro under the iced surface of the lake.

The authors of the false communication included Antonio Chichiarelli, a notorious forger from Rome who was connected to the Banda della Magliana gang of the city. Chichiarelli would later issue further false communications from the Red Brigades. He was killed in uncertain circumstances in September 1984 when his connection with the false communiqué had been yet entirely clarified. Chichiarelli spoke of the communication to several people, including Luciano Dal Bello, a confidant of the Carabinieri and of SISDE. Del Bello reported the facts but no investigation on Chichiarelli followed.

In the same day that the police force found an apartment used as a base by the Red Brigades in Rome, on via Gradoli 96. The discovery was allegedly due to a water leak for which a neighbour had called the firemen. The leak was caused by a tap left open in the apartment's shower in an unusual fashion, i.e. with water directed against the wall. The base was normally used by Mario Moretti but the Italian media reported the discovery immediately and he avoided returning there. As previously mentioned, the palace had been inspected by Carabinieri under colonel Varisco, with the exclusion of Moretti's apartment: the official justification was that the Carabinieri were not authorized to enter the apartments if no one was inside. The owner of the apartment, Luciana Bozzi, was later discovered to be a friend of Giuliana Conforto, whose father was named in the Mitrokhin list of the KGB, and in whose apartments Morucci and Faranda were later arrested.

The commissar who had led Rome's police forces in the inspection of the building on via Gradoli, Elio Coppa, was eventually promoted to vice-director of SISDE—he later turned out to be a member of P2. The neighbor whose call had led to the inspection, Lucia Mokbel, was officially a university student of Egyptian descent and was later identified as a confidant of SISDE or of the police. Furthermore, the report of the inspection, which was presented at the trial on the Moro affair, was written on a type of paper distributed to the Italian police only in 1981, three years after the events.

Before, and after 1978, numerous apartments in the street had been used by Italian secret agents, including a Carabinieri NCO enrolled by SISMI who resided in the building facing that of Moretti and who was from the same birthplace. In the street, there were also firms used by SISMI for its affairs. Moretti's apartment itself had been under observation by UCIGOS for several years previously as it had been frequented also by members of the far-left organizations Potere Operaio and Autonomia Operaia. Later it was revealed that the Christian Democracy parliament member Benito Cazora, during the contact he had with the 'ndrangheta (the Calabrian mafia) in the attempt to find Moro's prison, had been warned that the area of via Gradoli was a "hot zone". Cazora had reported this warning to the DC and to the police.

Mino Pecorelli, already mentioned for his likely knowledge of the presence of Moretti in via Gradoli, was one of the few journalists to immediately deny the authenticity of "Communication No.7", whereas most authorities had considered it true.

Some 30 years after the events Steve Pieczenik, an expert on terrorism of the US State Department, declared in an interview that the decision to issue the false communication was taken during a meeting of the crisis committee, present at which were Francesco Cossiga, members of the Italian intelligence agencies and Franco Ferracuti (as previously mentioned, a member of P2). The alleged goal was to prepare the Italian and European audience for the likely death of Moro in the kidnapping. He however stated that it would be ignored if the communication had been actually issued. See also below

It was also supposed that Moro had told his kidnappers of the existence of Operation Gladio, many years before its public revelation in 1990. From this point of view, the false "Communication No.7" was a code message from sectors of the Italian secret agencies that Moro should not return alive from his imprisonment.

On 20 April 1978, the Red Brigades issued the true Communication No.7: they attached a photo of Aldo Moro holding a copy of La Repubblica, dated 19 April, showing that the politician was still alive.

The séance 

Also connected to via Gradoli is an event which involved Romano Prodi, Mario Baldassarri and Alberto Clò. During an alleged séance in which they participated on 2 April 1978, after asking the soul of Giorgio La Pira about the location of Moro, a Ouija table they were using registered the words Viterbo, Bolsena and Gradoli, three towns north of Rome. The information was trusted and a police group made an armed blitz in the town of Gradoli, 80 km from Rome, on the following day, 6 April though Moro was not found. Prodi spoke to the Italian parliament's commission about the case in 1981. In the notes of the Italian parliament commission on terrorism, the séance is described as a fake, used to hide the true source of the information. In 1997, Giulio Andreotti declared that the information came from the Bologna section of Autonomia Operaia, a far-left organization with some ties with the BR, and that Cossiga also knew the true source. Judge Ferdinando Imposimato considered Andreotti's theory as "possible", but accused him of having kept information that could have been valuable in a trial about Moro's murder.

Moro's widow later declared that she had repeatedly informed the police that a via Gradoli existed in Rome, but the investigators did not consider it — some replied to her that the street did not appear in Rome's maps. This is confirmed by other Moro relatives, but strongly denied by Francesco Cossiga.

In the 1990s, the séance matter was reopened by the Italian parliament's commission on terrorism. While Prodi (then prime minister) declared that he had no time for an interview, both Baldassarri (senator and vice-minister in two Berlusconi cabinets) and Clò (minister of Industry in Lamberto Dini's cabinet and owner of the house where the séance was performed) responded to the call: they confirmed the circumstances of the séance, and that the word "Gradoli" had appeared in several sessions, even if the participants had changed.

Involvement of the Mafia 
In the years following Moro's murder, there have been numerous references to the presence of Calabrian 'ndrangheta at via Fani. In an intercepted phone call between Sereno Freato, then Moro's personal secretary, and Benito Cazora, a DC parliament member who had been given the task to keep contacts with the Calabrian gangs, Freato asks for news about the prison of Moro. The 'ndrangheta was in possession of several photos of the events in via Fani, some of which allegedly portrayed a "man known by them". According to what was reported by Cazora in 1991, some members of the 'ndrangheta, who had been expelled from Calabria, had offered their assistance to the Christian Democracy to discover the location of Moro, in exchange for the possibility to return to their homeland. However, this collaboration never materialized.

According to the Sicilian Mafia pentito Tommaso Buscetta, several Italian state organizations tried to obtain information about Moro's location from the Mafia, but later Giuseppe Calò asked boss Stefano Bontade to stop the search, since the highest members of DC no longer desired the liberation of their fellow politician. The decision to abandon the search was taken between 9 and 10 April after Moro had revealed to his captors a series of very compromising information about the American CIA and Giulio Andreotti. Other sources report that the Sicilian Mafia changed its mind due to Moro's will to associate the Communist Party with the government.

In a deposition made at trial Raffaele Cutolo, then leader of the Neapolitan camorra, declared that the Banda della Magliana asked him if he was interested in the liberation of Moro. Cutolo contacted the Italian secret service who replied to him to stay away from the matter, because had vetoed the intermediation for the salvation of the then president of the DC. Valerio Morucci has completely discredited this confused story: he showed that the Camorra's militants were apparently "normal people in suits", completely alien environment of the underworld and therefore difficult to identify from the Banda della Magliana. Morucci concluded: "We weren't a gang ... we didn't meet under the street lights ... we didn't do we trade strange ... I don't see how the Banda della Magliana or anyone could identify the Red Brigades".

On 15 October 1993, a 'Ndrangheta pentito, declared that Antonio Nirta, another Calabrian gangster who had been infiltrated in the Red Brigades, took part in the assault in via Fani. Sergio Flamigni, a former communist senator and member of the Italian Parliament commission on the Moro affair, wrote that when he learnt about Morabito's words he remembered about the testimony of Benito Cazora, who had declared that he had been approached by a Calabrian asking him about photos shot in via Fani.

According to the 'Ndrangheta pentito Francesco Fonti, his boss Sebastiano Romeo was involved in attempts to locate the place where Moro was held. With the help of SISMI and the Banda della Magliana, Fonti was able to locate the house where Moro was kept. When he reported back, Romeo said that he had done a good job but that important politicians in Rome had changed their minds.

Morabito's revelations were not considered supported by adequate evidence.

Role of Carmine Pecorelli 

Journalist Carmine "Mino" Pecorelli, who apparently had several informers in the Italian secret services, spoke repeatedly about the kidnapping of Moro in his magazine Osservatorio Politico (or simply OP). Before the events of via Fani, Pecorelli had already written about the possibility that Moro would be blocked in his attempt to admit the Italian Communist Party into the government. On 15 March 1978, one day before Moro was abducted, Osservatorio Politico published an article which, citing the anniversary of the killing of Julius Caesar in relation with the upcoming formation of Andreotti's cabinet, mentioned a possible new Brutus (one of the assassins of Caesar, and a member of his family).

Articles written during the politician's imprisonment show that he already knew of the existence of a memorial (the documents written by Moro in his detention) and of some of the unpublished letters. Pecorelli stated that there were two groups within the Red Brigades, one favourable to the negotiations, and one who wanted to kill Moro in any case. He hinted that the group that had captured Moro in via Fani was not the same that was detaining him, and which had planned the whole move. He wrote:

When the terrorist base in via Gradoli was discovered Pecorelli stressed how in the apartment, different from what could be expected, all the proofs of the BR's presence were clearly displayed. Regarding the kidnapping, he wrote that Moro's opening to the Communist Party was not welcome, both by the United States as it would change the political balance of southern Europe, nor by the Soviet Union since this would prove that Communists could reach power democratically, and without being a direct offshoot of any Communist party.

On 20 March 1979, Pecorelli was murdered in front of his house. In 1992, the Mafia pentito Tommaso Buscetta revealed that the journalist had been eliminated as "a favor to Andreotti", who was preoccupied about some information about Moro's kidnapping in the possession of Pecorelli. The latter had allegedly received from general Dalla Chiesa (they were both affiliated or near to P2) a copy of a letter by Moro which contained dangerous accusations against Andreotti; the journalist had hinted about them in some previous articles. The unabridged letters were published only in 1991 when, together with others, it was discovered during renovation works in via Nevoso (only a resume of them, the so-called Memoriale Moro, had been previously issued). The fact that Moro's letters were circulating before 1991 is proven by a speech held by Bettino Craxi, leader of the Italian Socialist Party (PSI), in which he mentioned a letter which had not been officially published at the time. The fact was considered a subtle menace against Andreotti in the war for the supreme political power waged between PSI and DC at the time.

In 1993, historian  expressed doubts about what was said by the Mafia pentiti because, comparing the two memorials (the "amputee" of 1978 and the "complete" of 1990), noted that Moro's allegations addressed to Andreotti were the same, so Andreotti had no interest to order the murder of Pecorelli, who could not threaten him to publish things already known and publicly available.

Andreotti underwent a trial for his role in the assassination of Pecorelli. He was acquitted in the first grade trial (1999), condemned in the second (2002), and finally acquitted by the Italian Supreme Court (2003).

Pecorelli, in an article written the very day of his assassination, hinted to the role of opera composer Igor Markevitch (see below) in the kidnapping.

Role of Steve Pieczenik 
Steve Pieczenik was an American negotiatior and expert in terrorism who was sent by the US State Department, at the request of Cossiga, and remained in Italy for three weeks during Moro's detention. He later collaborated with Tom Clancy as a novel and cinematic writer. His presence in Italy as a member of one of the previously mentioned "crisis committees" was revealed only in the early 1990s. Pieczenik had written to a relation in which he spoke about the possible effects of Moro's abduction, the possibility that the Red Brigades had been infiltrated by Italian agents, and also gave advice about how to find the terrorists. Eventually however, Pieczenik declared that this relation was false, since the ideas included were similar to those of the P2-affiliated criminologist Francesco Ferracuti, another member of the secret committee. Pieczenik also stated that he did not release any written document.

According to what was revealed by Cossiga and by Pieczenik himself, his initial idea was to show the will to negotiate, with the goal of gaining time and in the hope that the terrorists would make some error from which they could be detected. During later interviews, Pieczenik declared that there were numerous leaks about the discussions made at the committee:

Pieczenik also declared that, once returned to the United States, he met an alleged Argentinian secret agent who knew everything that had happened at the Italian crisis committee. Pieczenik explained the leak to Argentina with the presence in the committee of numerous members of the P2 lodge, which had strong ties with the South American country (its founder Licio Gelli had lived for a period there).

In a later interview to French journalist Emmanuel Amara, Pieczenik declared:

At his arrival in Italy, Pieczenik had been informed by Cossiga and the Vatican intelligence services that there had been a coup attempt in Italy in previous months, led by right-winged personalities of the intelligence services and of P2. Pieczenik was astonished by the presence of so many fascists in the Italian intelligence services. The Red Brigades had also infiltrated the Italian institutions and obtained information from the children of politicians who were members of left and far-left organizations. With the help of the Vatican intelligence, which he considered superior to the Italian one, he investigated such infiltrations, but no measures were taken.

Pieczenik also declared that he participated in the decision to issue the false "Communication No.7", stating that he pushed the BR to kill Moro in order to de-legitimise them, once it was clear that the Italian politicians were not interested in his liberation. According to Pieczenik, the United States did not have a clear image of the situation in Italy, especially for the left and right-wing terrorist groups; he also said that he received no help from CIA or the US embassy in Italy.

Pieczenik explained his premature return to the US with the desire to avoid the accusations of American pressure behind the now likely death of Moro. Previously he had instead declared that he had left in order to deprive the decisions taken by the Italian institutions, which he considered inefficient and corrupted, of any US legitimisation.

Role of Igor Markevitch 
Russian composer and conductor Igor Markevitch has also been purported to have helped the kidnappers, housing them in his villa at Florence and perhaps preparing the questions made to Moro. His residence in Rome faced via Michelangelo Caetani (Markevitch had married the daughter of the nobleman after whom the street was named), where Moro's body was found after he was killed.

A report issued by SISMI in 1980 mentions one "Igor, of the dukes Caetani family", who had a prominent role in the Red Brigades organization. Two agents of SISMI were investigating near Paleazzo Caetani in early May 1978 when Moro had not yet been murdered. They were stopped by an unspecified "superior intervention" (allegedly coming from the agency's director, Giuseppe Santovito, a member of P2). Markevitch has been also identified as the "mysterious intermediary" mentioned by the Red Brigades in their Communication No.4.

In the article written the very day in which he was killed, Mino Pecorelli, speaking of the "prison of the people" where Moro was kept, mentioned a palace having a frieze with lions and located in the centre of Rome; and described a duchess who could see the body of Moro from her balcony. The Caetani palace in which Markevitch and his wife lived had a bas-relief of two lions biting two horses.

Alleged presence of a marksman 
In the course of Moro's capture, the terrorists fired 93 bullets. These killed all the five members of the escort but left Moro with only a light wound in his thigh. Despite this apparent precision, members of the BR such as Valerio Morucci declared that they had only a rough shooting training, obtained by firing their weapons in grottoes at night. The position of the bodyguards (two sitting in the front seats of Moro's car, and three in the following one), separated from the politician, likely made it easier for the ambush squad to direct their fire against them and avoid hitting Moro.

However, several writers and observers suggested that the ambushers of via Fani included a marksman. Sources such as the magazine l'espresso further suppose that he could have been a member of the Italian intelligence service and identify him as Giustino De Vuono, a marksman once part of the French Foreign Legion: according to their reconstruction, the 49 bullets found in the bodies of the bodyguards would come from his weapon. A witness reporting on 19 April 1978 at Rome's Prefecture declared that he had recognized De Vuono driving a green Austin Mini or Autobianchi A112 on the location of the massacre. De Vuono, who was affiliated with the 'Ndrangheta (Calabrian mafia), on that day was not in his usual residence in southern Paraguay (at the time under the dictatorship of Alfredo Stroessner). Several members of the Red Brigades declared that their weapons were acquired from the Calabrian gangland, amongst others; further, it has been proved that members of DC got in touch with Calabrian gangsters to obtain a help in the liberation of Moro.

The identity of the alleged marksman has been also associated to the German terrorist group RAF. Another witness of the events in via Fani declared that some thirty minutes before the ambush, a foreigner with German accent had addressed him, ordering to go away from the area.

Since some of the ammunition used for the massacre had been treated with a special preserving paint (which was also found in some secret depots related to the Gladio undercover organization), it has been suggested that these would come from some Italian military or paramilitary corps.

Theory of the alternative kidnapping 
Journalist Rita di Giovacchino suggests that Moro was not in via Fani during the massacre, but had been taken prisoner by another organization and that the Red Brigades acted only as "front men". This would explain their reticence and the incongruity of their declarations about the whole kidnapping (from the ambush, to the presence of sand on Moro's body). According to her, this would also explain the prophetic remark pronounced by Sereno Freato, first secretary of Aldo Moro, when Carmine Pecorelli (see above) was also found dead: "Investigate on the instigators of Pecorelli's murder, and would find the instigators of Moro's murder". She thus lists as part of the same plot the deaths of Pecorelli, Chichiarelli (who would have been punished for his blackmailing attempts) and of Carabinieri colonel . Allegedly killed by the Red Brigades in 1979, although in circumstances never clear, Antonio Varisco had been at the helm of the investigation on the BR base in via Gradoli; he was also a friend of general Carlo Alberto Dalla Chiesa (also murdered for never completely understood reasons), as well as of Pecorelli. The use made by BR of printing machines once owned by the Italian intelligence, according to di Giovacchino, shows that the latter were likely the organization behind all these bloody acts.

Mario Moretti declared that he was studying Moro's daily moves since 1976. Every morning, the politician went with his grandson to a church near his house, after which he had a short walk with only one member of the escort. This looked like a more favourable moment to kidnap him, since most of the bodyguards were not present, but was not chosen by the terrorists. On the morning of his abduction, Moro did not bring his grandson with him.

After the ambush in via Fani, the terrorists took only the most interesting for them of the five bags that Moro carried with him. Those containing the politician's medicines and his reserved documents. Further, the necessity of inflicting a coup de grâce to any of the bodyguards is in contrast with a hurried attack typical of such acts, and is motivated only by the necessity to eliminate any possible witness that would reveal that Moro was not there. In a letter to his wife, Moro wrote during captivity he asked her to take care of his bags. Since Moro was surely aware that if his bags had been found in the massacre location, they had been taken by the investigators. Also, the absence from his letter of any word about the victims of via Fani has been taken as an element in favour of the theory that Moro was captured while in his Gladio escort (see Involvement of P2, Gladio and of the Italian intelligence services) and not in via Fani and so did not know anything about their assassination.

Doubts about the kidnapping
Numerous unanswered questions surround Moro's kidnapping in via Fani:
Moro's widow, Eleonora Chiavarelli, noted that in Moro's letters, delivered by the terrorists, there is no mention of the killing of his bodyguards: given the character of Aldo Moro, she considered it improbable that he did not write a single word about these victims.
On 1 October 1993, during the fourth trial on the Moro affair, ballistic experts released a report which disputed the version of Valerio Morucci. According to their new report, a second member of the ambush squad fired towards the Fiat 132.
The number of the participants in the ambush (the terrorists initially spoke of nine, later of eleven people) is considered small by other terrorists, such as Red Brigades co-founder Alberto Franceschini. He declared: "For the capture of Mario Sossi, in 1974, we were twelve. I think that managing a kidnapping such as that of via Fani with 11 is quite risky".
Alessandro Marini, an engineer who passed by via Fani the day of the assault, declared that two people on a Honda motorbike shot at him with a firearm. The motorbike preceded Mario Moretti's car. However, members of the Red Brigades always denied the presence of the Honda and did not explain the origin of the shooting against Marini.
An unexplained element is how the terrorists could have planned an ambush in via Fani, since Moro's escort changed their routes daily. However, the terrorists for the occasion had taken measures, such as cutting the tyres of the van of a florist who worked in via Fani (in order to remove a dangerous witness during the ambush), which can be explained only by their having precise knowledge of Moro's route that morning.
SIP, then Italy's national telephone company, was exceedingly inefficient on numerous occasions linked to Moro's detention. In particular, after the assault in via Fani, all the phone communications in the area were inoperative. Other examples included when, on 14 April, journalists of Rome's newspaper Il Messaggero were waiting for a phone call from the terrorists. The six phone lines in the newspaper's office had been connected to police central but, when the call arrived, DIGOS reported that all of them had been cut, with the result that the caller could not be identified. On 15 March 1978, the day before the capture of Moro, SIP had been alerted. However, after Moro had been kidnapped, an inspection of the telephone lines in the area of via Fani showed that they were all out of order. This prevented any possible witness contact with the police before the ambush. The commander of DIGOS during the kidnapping days described SIP as "totally un-cooperative", and stated that "in no occasion did they find the origin of the kidnappers' calls", concluding by noting that Michele Principe, then general director of STET, the company that owned SIP, was a member of the P2 lodge.

Other suspicions and controversies 
Chichiarelli, the author of the false "Communication No.7", was related to the Banda della Magliana. Aside from its purely criminal activities this large gang in Rome was related to Sicilian Mafia and has been involved in numerous political and terrorist scandals since the 1970s. Judiciary acts have proved that members of the gang had a role in the assassination of Pecorelli and in the case of Roberto Calvi (both of which saw the incrimination of Giulio Andreotti), in the financial affairs of the Vatican City (including the kidnapping of Emanuela Orlandi), and in the sidetracking of the investigations on massacres such as that of Bologna Station. Judge Ferdinando Imposimato proved that the "Banda della Magliana" had strong ties with SISMI (Italy's military intelligence agency), and that the latter inspired the farce of the communication and of the Lago della Duchessa. Finally, the apartment of via Montalcini, in which Moro was allegedly detained by the Red Brigades, was located in the Magliana quarter of southern Rome and a member of the gang owned the building facing that apartment.
Members of Moro's escort, who were not in service on the day of the kidnap, declared in September 1978 that Moro was a habitual person, and that every day he got out from his house exactly at 09:00 AM. However, Moro's widow denied this circumstance during her interview in front of the investigative judges on 23 September 1978.
Francesco Cossiga declared that Moro's confessor, Don Antonio Mennini (later papal nuncio to Great Britain), was allowed to enter in the politician's cell just before his execution. In 2015, Don Mennini has denied this reconstruction.

Political consequences 

The kidnapping and murder of Moro drastically changed the politics of Italy.

The Historic Compromise between DC and PCI, one of Moro's main goals, was not liked by Italy's main international partners. On 23 March 1976, Aldo Moro, during his tenure as prime minister, took part in the G7 conference in Puerto Rico. When he asked his colleagues' opinions about the matter they replied to him that, if it materialized, the presence of the Communists in the executive would cause the loss of international support (including financial ones) for Italy. At the previous general elections, DC had scored a 38%, followed by PCI with 34%. Moro was considered a natural candidate for the next President of the Italian Republic, with the ensuing realization of the government alliance between the two parties. His assassination marked the definitive end of the Historic Compromise.

On 16 March 1978, the very day of the kidnapping of Moro, Andreotti's cabinet obtained the vote of confidence: it was voted for by all the Italian parties, with the exception of the Social Movement, the Liberal Party (the first a far right party, the second a centre-right one), the Radical Party and of Proletarian Democracy (the latter being left/far left formations). The executive was formed exclusively by members from DC and could govern only with the indirect support of PCI (the so-called non sfiducia, non-no confidence).

Between 1978 and 1979, Italy was involved with a series of events, after the assassination of Moro; on 15 June, Giovanni Leone resigned from the presidency of the Republic, ending six months before his term as a result of harsh polemics and attacks on his person. A few weeks later, Sandro Pertini was elected with plebiscite vote. In January 1979, Andreotti's cabinet resigned: Pertini entrusted the task to Ugo La Malfa, but the attempt failed and there were new elections.
At successive elections, the DC remained stable while the PCI suffered a sharp setback:
this result marked the end of the government of national solidarity and the possibility of entry of the Communists in the executive.

The party, under the stronger influence of Ciriaco De Mita (from 1982 to 1989), Giulio Andreotti and Arnaldo Forlani (from 1989), remained a government party until 1994; in the 1992 elections went down for the first time below 30% of the votes due to the Lega Nord's growth in Northern Italy, and following the requests of Mani pulite scandal (and the ties between the Mafia and Andreotti himself) that also involved the allied parties (in addition to former PCI, renamed PDS, involved at the local level), continued to lose support. In 1994, the party was disbanded and the DC's last secretary, Mino Martinazzoli, decided to change the name of the party to the Italian People's Party.

According to the acts of the Italian Parliament commission on terrorism:

See also 
 The Moro Affair
 Years of Lead
 Terrorism in the European Union

References

Sources

Further reading

External links 

 Interactive website/Blog about the Moro affair 
 The Moro Affair from A to Z 
 Gallery of contemporary frontpages and videos

1970s in Rome
1978 mass shootings in Europe
1978 murders in Italy
Kidnapping
Communist terrorism
Conspiracy theories in Italy
Deaths by person in Italy
Kidnapping in the 1970s
Kidnappings in Italy
March 1978 crimes
March 1978 events in Europe
Mass murder in 1978
20th-century mass murder in Italy
Mass shootings in Italy
Murder in Rome
Red Brigades
Terrorist incidents in Italy in 1978
Terrorist incidents in Lazio
Years of Lead (Italy)